Steven R. "Steve" Malagari (born October 17, 1983) is an American politician serving as a Democratic member of the Pennsylvania House of Representatives for the 53rd district. He has held the position since January 1, 2019.

Career
In 2012, Malagari was elected to the Lansdale Borough Council and served in the position until he was elected to the House in 2018. Malagari also served on the Montgomery County Transportation Authority starting in 2013.

In 2018 Malagari beat fellow Lansdale Borough Councilman Leon Angelichio for the Democratic nomination. Malagari challenged Republican Andy Szekely and Libertarian John Waldenberger for the seat left vacant by Representative Bob Godshall and ultimately won the election on November 6, 2018, becoming the first Democrat to hold the seat since 1972.

Committee assignments 

 Consumer Affairs
 Liquor Control
 Local Government
 Tourism & Recreational Development

Personal
Malagari is a graduate of North Penn High School.  He graduated from Ursinus College where he earned a Bachelors of Science in Biology and German. He lives in Lansdale with his wife Rachel.

References

Living people
Democratic Party members of the Pennsylvania House of Representatives
1983 births
People from Lansdale, Pennsylvania
21st-century American politicians
Ursinus College alumni
American people of Greek descent

Pennsylvania local politicians